Woodley Park station (also known as Woodley Park–Zoo / Adams Morgan) is an underground station on the Red Line of the Washington Metro. Located at 24th Street and Connecticut Avenue Northwest, it serves the neighborhoods of Woodley Park and Adams Morgan in Northwest Washington.

Station layout

Woodley Park was the first in the system to deviate from the waffle-like coffers found at most underground stations in downtown Washington, instead using a simpler four-coffer arch. The advantage of the four-coffer arch was that it was pre-cast in Winchester, Virginia, and then hauled underground and installed on-site, while the waffle-style arches used in other stations had to be cast in place. This was done as a cost-saving measure.

Access to the station's mezzanine is provided by two sets of three escalators, connected by a short walkway just underneath street level. The entrance is located at the southwest corner of Connecticut Avenue and Woodley Road. An elevator connects to the street with the mezzanine, which contains fare control and access to the island platform.

After Forest Glen, it is the second deepest station in the system.

History

The station opened on December 5, 1981.

The Adams Morgan neighborhood lies at the other end of the nearby Duke Ellington Bridge, and "Adams Morgan" was added to the station name in 1999 to reflect this. On November 3, 2011, the station was renamed to "Woodley Park", with "Zoo/Adams Morgan" as a subtitle.

On November 3, 2004, an out-of-service train rolled backwards into the station and collided with an in-service train. The non-fatal collision injured about 20 people and caused $3.5 million in damages. An investigation determined that the operator of the runaway train was likely asleep.

The original escalators were replaced in 2015–18.

References

External links
 

 24th Street entrance from Google Maps Street View

Stations on the Red Line (Washington Metro)
Washington Metro stations in Washington, D.C.
Railway stations in the United States opened in 1981
1981 establishments in Washington, D.C.
Adams Morgan
Railway stations located underground in Washington, D.C.